Rety is a commune in the Pas-de-Calais department in the Hauts-de-France region of France.

Geography
Rety is a farming and light industrial village comprising 15 hamlets and Rety itself.

Population

Places of interest
 The church of St. Martin, dating from the fifteenth century.
 The nineteenth century Château d'Austruy.
 Traces of an old castle.

See also
Communes of the Pas-de-Calais department

References

External links

 Commune official website 
 Website about the history of Rety 

Communes of Pas-de-Calais